Hans (Nick) Roericht (born November 15, 1932 in Schönkirch, Germany), is a German designer. He was professor at the Hochschule der Künste Berlin, Industriedesign IV, from 1973 to 2002. He designed the TC100 stacking tableware for his thesis at the Ulm School of Design in 1959, which was taken into the collection of the Museum of Modern Art in New York.

Roericht studied at the Ulm School of Design from 1955 to 1959. He continued at the Ulm School of Design collaborating first with Georg Leowald in 1960, and then Otl Aicher since 1961 - also being a part of Aicher's design team of the 1972 Summer Olympics in Munich. From 1966 to 1967, Roericht taught as a professor at the Ohio State University.

External links 

 Image of TC 100

References

1932 births
Living people
German designers
Academic staff of the Berlin University of the Arts
People from Tirschenreuth (district)